Lysiane Rey (Jacqueline, Andrée, Albertine, Louise Leharanger) (13 November 1922 in Amiens – 1 October 1975 in Maisons-Laffitte) was a French actress. With Albert Préjean she was the mother of actor Patrick Préjean, and the grandmother of actress Laura Préjean.

Filmography

 1941 : Strange Suzy by Pierre-Jean Ducis
 1941 : A Woman in the Night by Edmond T. Gréville
 1941 : Six petites filles en blanc by Yvan Noé
 1941 : Après l'orage by Pierre-Jean Ducis
 1943 : Les Ailes blanches by Robert Péguy
 1943 : Le Secret du Florida by Jacques Houssin
 1947 : The Three Cousins by Jacques Daniel-Norman
 1950 : Mademoiselle Josette, My Woman by André Berthomieu
 1950 : L'Homme de joie by Gilles Grangier
 1950 : Le Roi des camelots by André Berthomieu
 1951 : Sins of Madeleine by Henri Lepage
 1951 : Duel in Dakar by Claude Orval and Georges Combret
 1952 : Rires de Paris by Henri Lepage
 1952 : Mon curé chez les riches by Henri Diamant-Berger
 1952 : Minuit quai de Bercy by Christian Stengel
 1955 : Your Turn, Callaghan by Willy Rozier
 1956 : La Fille Elisa by Roger Richebé
 1959 : Vers l'extase by René Wheeler
 1965 : Quand passent les faisans by Edouard Molinaro

References

1922 births
1974 deaths
French film actresses
People from Amiens
20th-century French actresses